Brooks Hill is a historic American Revolutionary War site associated with the revolution's first battle, the 1775 battles of Lexington and Concord. It was here, beside the Battle Road, that the British regulars passed on their marches to Concord from Boston, and again on their retreat east. It has also been referred to as Hardy's Hill.

Named for the Brooks family, today's Brooks Village Historical Area is located immediately to the north of Route 2A (the North Great Road), near Battle Road (or Bay Road), in Lincoln, Massachusetts. It is today part of Minute Man National Historical Park.

History 
The area was inhabited around twelve thousand years before the arrival of European immigrants. Algonquin people lived beside the Musketaquid River prior to the establishment of the Concord plantation.

Geography 

April 19, 1775 
The British began their eighteen-mile journey back to Boston from Concord around noon. Around the same time, large numbers of colonial militia (known as minutemen) began to take their positions atop the Brooks Hill plateau. The first to arrive were 180 men from Woburn who arrived via the meeting house in Lincoln. Major Loammi Baldwin took some respite at one of the farmhouses of the Brooks family.

As their enemies drew nearer, but possibly before any altercation at Meriam's Corner had begun, Baldwin had his soldiers move east to Elm Brook Hill. A short while later, gunfire did begin in the area between Meriam's Corner and Brook's Hill.

Two companies of minutemen and militia arrived from East Sudbury and met the British column on the southern side of the Bay Road, near its intersection with Brooks Road. When the British rearguard began to climb Brooks Hill, part of the colonists sprinted across the low open fields on the northern side of the road to position themselves near Elm Brook Hill.

References 

18th century in Boston
Lincoln, Massachusetts
1775 in the Thirteen Colonies
1775 in Massachusetts
Military history of New England
American Revolutionary War sites in Massachusetts